Catephia endoplaga is a species of moth of the  family Erebidae. It is found in Ghana.

References

Endemic fauna of Ghana
Catephia
Moths described in 1926
Moths of Africa